The president of the Council of State is the leader of Luxembourg's Council of State.

The president is appointed by the grand duke, along with two vice presidents, and the appointment lasts for one year (although it can be renewed). The president of the Council of State must be either a member of the Council of State or the grand duke himself. However, to date, the latter option has never been taken, and it has become convention that the grand duke cannot be the president.

Note that the position has often been left vacant, so few of the successions were immediate.

List of presidents

See also
 List of members of the Council of State of Luxembourg 
 List of presidents of the Chamber of Deputies of Luxembourg

Presidents of the Council of State of Luxembourg